The 2001 Oceania Club Championships was held in January 2001. The tournament was designed to decide the Oceania Football Confederation's entrant into the 2001 FIFA Club World Championship; however that Club World Championship tournament was cancelled by FIFA.  The competition was held in Port Moresby, Papua New Guinea, with all matches held at the Lloyd Robson Stadium.  The tournament was won by Australian club Wollongong Wolves.

Participants

A total of 11 teams from 11 OFC member associations entered the competition.

Group stage
The eleven participants were placed in two groups, where each team played the other teams once. The group winners and second placed teams progressed to the semi-finals.

Group A

Results

Match schedule

Group B

Results

Match schedule

Note: The OFC disciplinary committee ruled that 7 of PanSa's 18 players were not registered according to international transfer rules, some of which had been fielded in their first two matches.  The first two matches were thus awarded 2–0 to the opposition, whilst PanSa were unable to field a team in the 3rd match (which was not played, and subsequently awarded 2–0 to Tafea). PanSa then withdrew from the competition, causing their fourth match to be awarded 2–0 to Titavi.

Knockout stage

Semi finals
The top two teams from each group progressed to the semifinals.

Third Place Playoff

Final

Champion

Wollongong Wolves are the 2001 Oceania Club Champions and qualified for the 2001 FIFA Club World Championship. However, the Club World Championships were cancelled that year.

External links
OFC Club Championship 2000/01 site
Oceania Club Cup 2000–01 at RSSSF

Oceania Club Championship
2001
1
OFC
OFC